Snowboarding at the 2017 European Youth Olympic Winter Festival was held at the Palandoken Ski Centre in Erzurum, Turkey from 13 to 16 February 2017.

Results

Men's events

Women's events

Mixed

References

External links
Results Book – Snowboard

2017 in snowboarding
2017
2017 European Youth Olympic Winter Festival events